Alfredo López (born 8 December 1947) is a Mexican wrestler. He competed in the men's Greco-Roman 57 kg at the 1972 Summer Olympics.

References

External links
 

1947 births
Living people
Mexican male sport wrestlers
Olympic wrestlers of Mexico
Wrestlers at the 1972 Summer Olympics
Place of birth missing (living people)
Pan American Games medalists in wrestling
Pan American Games bronze medalists for Mexico
Wrestlers at the 1975 Pan American Games
Medalists at the 1975 Pan American Games
20th-century Mexican people
21st-century Mexican people